Lakeshore, California may refer to:
Lakeshore, Fresno County, California
Lakeshore, Placer County, California, Placer County, California
Lakeshore, Shasta County, California, Shasta County, California

See also
Lakehead-Lakeshore, California, Shasta County, California